Rogotin is a village in southern Dalmatia, Croatia, located between Ploče and Metković.

It is administratively part of the town of Ploče and it has 665 inhabitants (2011 census).

References

External links
 Info Rogotin

Populated places in Dubrovnik-Neretva County